Abigail Borah is an American environmental activist who interrupted Todd Stern at the 2011 United Nations Climate Change Conference and who co-founded Race to Replace Vermont Yankee.

Early life and education 

Borah grew up near Princeton and attended Stuart Country Day School of the Sacred Heart.

Borah studied at Middlebury College where she majored in Conservation Biology. While studying, she joined SustainUS, who sent her to the 2010 United Nations Climate Change Conference in Cancun (also known as COP-16.)

Activism and career 

In 2011, when she was 21 years old, Borah interrupted US negotiator Todd Stern at the 2011 United Nations Climate Change Conference (COP-17) in Durban to say:“I am speaking on behalf of the United States of America because my negotiators cannot. I am scared for my future. 2020 is too late to wait.”Borah was met with applause from the audience and had her credentials allowing her to attend the conference removed by guards. Stern later conceded that he agreed with her points. She was later dubbed as the "Durban Climate Hero" by Climate Progress.
Borah is the co-founder of Race to Replace Vermont Yankee, a campaign that aims to replace nuclear power in Vermont with clean energy.

See also 

 Emily Cunningham
 Julia Butterfly Hill
 Nicole Hernandez Hammer

References

External links 
 YouTube video (via Democracy Now!) of Borah at COP-17

1990 births
Middlebury College alumni
Founders of charities
People from Princeton, New Jersey
American environmentalists
American women environmentalists
Living people
Youth climate activists